The Real Club Valderrama ("Royal Valderrama Club") is one of the best known golf clubs in the world. It is located in the resort of Sotogrande, San Roque in the Andalusia region of southern Spain, a few miles from Gibraltar, and has a single 18-hole course, along with a 9-hole par 3 course.

Valderrama was the traditional host of the now defunct Volvo Masters, hosting the event from 1988 to 2008, with a five-year break when the event was moved to the Montecastillo Golf Club. It also hosted the Ryder Cup in 1997, the first time the event had been held outside either the United States or United Kingdom, the WGC-American Express Championship in 1999 and 2000, and several other professional tournaments on both the European Tour and Ladies European Tour.

Facilities

Golf course
Valderrama was constructed in 1974 as "Sotogrande New," to the designs of leading American golf course architect Robert Trent Jones. Renamed "Las Aves" in 1981, it was acquired by Jaime Ortiz-Patiño in 1984. The golf course was redesigned and expanded by the original architect and became "Valderrama." By 1999, Valderrama was rated the top course in mainland Europe by Golf World magazine.

Signature hole
The fourth hole, La Cascada, is the course's signature hole. It is a par 5 with a pond to the right of the two-tiered green. Before the 2016 Open de España, three national teams of four players tried to complete La Cascada in the fastest time. The French team of Raphaël Jacquelin, Alexander Lévy, Grégory Havret and Romain Wattel took four shots to complete the hole in 34.87 seconds, breaking the previous Guinness world record by half.

Driving range

Tournaments hosted
Ladies Spanish Open: 1982
Volvo Masters: 1988–1996; 2002–2008 
Ryder Cup: 1997 (the first ever held in Continental Europe)
WGC-American Express Championship: 1999, 2000
Andalucía Masters: 2010–2011, 2017–2022
Open de España: 2016

Future
LIV Golf Valderrama: 2023

See also
1997 Ryder Cup
List of golf clubs granted Royal status

References

External links

Golf clubs and courses in Spain
Ryder Cup venues
Sports venues in Andalusia
Golf clubs and courses designed by Robert Trent Jones
1974 establishments in Spain